Love and Other Disasters is a 2006 romantic comedy film written and directed by Alek Keshishian. It had its world premiere at the 2006 Toronto International Film Festival. In 2008, the film had its UK premiere in London as the gala screening for the BFI 22nd London Gay and Lesbian Film Festival.

Brittany Murphy portrays an assistant at British Vogue who is the catalyst for a group of young friends as they try to find love. Outfest 2007 presented the film as one of their features. Keshishian originally wanted Gwyneth Paltrow to play Jacks, but she was pregnant at the time. Paltrow was later given a cameo role.

Plot 
Emily "Jacks" Jackson is an American transplant living in London and working as an intern at British Vogue. She shares an apartment with her gay friend Peter Simon, a screenwriter. Afraid to be disappointed by a serious relationship, Jacks prefers to spend her free time with her friends and sleep with her ex-boyfriend, James, whom she does not love.

Peter, who has never been in a relationship, spends too much time in his dreams and as a result cannot fall in love with a real person. It gets more complicated with the entrance of Paolo, a photography assistant for one of the photographers at Vogue.  As the film develops, they come to realize their mistakes and eventually reach their happy endings.

Cast

Reception
David Rooney of Variety wrote, "wanly conceived effort looks an unlikely bet for significant bigscreen dates" and "Keshishian’s script is sloppy in both setting up and sustaining the sexual identity confusion that fuels the comic engine".

Greg Hernandez of Out in Hollywood called it "a damned entertaining film", "well-written and well-directed by Alek Keshishian and wonderfully acted" and "includes a hilarious scene featuring cameos by Gwyneth Paltrow and Orlando Bloom."

References

External links
 
 
 

2006 films
2006 LGBT-related films
2006 romantic comedy films
2000s English-language films
British LGBT-related films
British romantic comedy films
English-language French films
EuropaCorp films
Films directed by Alek Keshishian
Films produced by Luc Besson
Films set in London
Films shot in London
Films shot in Paris
French LGBT-related films
French romantic comedy films
LGBT-related romantic comedy films
2000s British films
2000s French films
Films with screenplays by Alek Keshishian